The Association of Consulting Engineers New Zealand (ACENZ) is New Zealand's main business association representing engineers providing consultancy services in a wide range of disciplines. It was founded in 1959 as the consulting division of IPENZ, though it has been a separate entity since 1970.

It has 176 corporate members with a total of around 8,500 staff (2007 data), up from about 5,800 in 2001.

Apart from its functions as a representative of the interests of its member companies, it annually judges engineering awards for the most innovative and exceptional engineering projects of New Zealand.

References

External links
ACENZ Online (official association website)

Consulting
Engineering societies based in New Zealand

1959 establishments in New Zealand
Organizations established in 1959